Actua Corporation was a venture capital firm. During the dot com bubble, the company had a market capitalization of over $50 billion. The company was originally known as Internet Capital Group, Inc. and changed its name to Actua Corporation in September 2014. In 2018, the company underwent liquidation.

History

Incubator 
In March 1996, Ken Fox and Walter Buckley left Safeguard Scientifics to form Internet Capital Group (ICG), a venture capital firm focused on business-to-business e-commerce. They asked Safeguard Scientifics CEO Pete Musser for $5 million in funding, but he insisted on investing $15 million. In total, Buckley and Fox raised $40 million to start ICG, twice what they wanted.

In addition to Safeguard Scientifics, major investors included Comcast, Compaq, BancBoston Ventures, and a dozen individuals. Initially, the company was organized as a limited-liability company.

Following the "keiretsu" model used by Safeguard Scientifics, the company was heavily involved in the operations of the companies in which it invested and the start-ups would do business with each other, increasing the value of all parties. Its annual meetings were opportunities for CEOs of partner companies to share their experiences and cut new deals. One member CEO called it "a perfect way to manage chaos." The work environment was casual, or as one partner company CEO called it, "almost like a fraternity".

One of ICG's first investments was a website called Water Online. Under the guidance of ICG, in late 1997, Water Online hired Mark Walsh, head of AOL's B2B division, as CEO. The company changed its name to VerticalNet, expanded into 47 different industries, and became one of the first B2B companies to become a public company, albeit with limited revenue.

Spurning opportunities to invest in online retailers such as CDNow and AutoWeb, ICG developed a reputation as "the VCs to see if you were an entrepreneur with a B2B idea." In July 1998, GE Capital invested in the company in a financing round that generated $70 million. Early investments began to pay off and ICG generated additional funds by selling some of its positions.

However, unlike traditional venture capitalists, Buckley and Fox envisioned that ICG would hold most of its investments for ten years or longer. The duo were ambitious, aiming to have a stake in 80% of the B2B market. In the fall of 1998, to support this goal, the company aggressively hired top talent from companies such as Microsoft, McKinsey & Co., General Electric, Cambridge Technology Partners, Heidrick & Struggles, and Softbank. After much effort, Fox persuaded Sam Jadallah, Microsoft's chief of enterprise sales and marketing, to join the company. In February 1999, the company converted to a C corporation. In May, $90 million of additional funding was raised via a convertible bond issue.

Public Company 
In August 1999, the company became a public company via an initial public offering, offering 14.9 million shares at $12 per share. The company sold another 7.5 million shares to IBM, generating more than $200 million. Dell Computer bought 1 million of the shares in the IPO. High-profile investors now included Amerindo Investment Advisors, the House of Saud, the Penske family, and David Bonderman. Safeguard Scientifics was the largest stakeholder.

At the time of the IPO, ICG held stakes in 35 companies. About half the businesses aimed to create either an online marketplace or online community, while the other half were engaged in software development.

The stock doubled in price on its first day, and hit $50 per share in October 1999. Book value of the company, including stakes in VerticalNet and U.S. Interactive which had gone public, was only about $1 billion and Wall Street was betting on future success.

By December 1999, the stock was trading at over $200 per share. Buckley's stake of 10 million shares, or 3.5% of the company and Fox's stake of 12 million shares, or 4.5% of the company, were each worth over $2 billion. The company was valued at nearly $60 billion, making it the 3rd largest Internet company by market capitalization behind AOL and Yahoo!. By then, the company had invested $300 million in 39 start-ups and had a staff of 29 people to manage and advise those companies. Operations were split into two locations with Buckley serving as CEO and working out of the Philadelphia area, while Fox managed West Coast operations in San Francisco. Three executives were hired in November to head a new European team.

In December 1999, the company raised over $1 billion in additional capital. During its first 9 months as a corporation, it realized only $14.8 million of revenue and lost $6.4 million. In 1998, it recorded a profit of $14 million on $3 million of revenue, with the profits coming from sales of companies.

By February 1, 2000, the stock had declined nearly $100 per share in anticipation of insider selling at the expiration of the lock-up period. However, retail investors bought up insider shares, stabilizing the price. Meanwhile, the company continued to expand its investments. By early 2000, the company had invested $1.4 billion in 61 start-up firms, and was forging new partnerships with old economy leaders. The rapid expansion was motivated by what Fox called "the biggest wealth-creation opportunity the world has ever seen" – finding the promising e-commerce B2B companies before anyone else.

The NASDAQ Composite stock market index peaked in March 2000 and the company was hurt by the bursting of the dot-com bubble. By April 2000, its stock was down to $40 a share and GE Capital filed to sell nearly 1 million shares. By June 2000, the stock was down to $30 per share. Buckley, who sold very little of his own stock, remained optimistic. By November 2000, the stock was down to $11 per share and after the September 11 attacks it traded for 70 cents per share. Two years after its peak in March 2000, the company had a market capitalization of $200 million, down 99.5%.

The company survived the crash, and changed its business model. Instead of taking small stakes in many companies, it invested in a few "core" companies at a time, usually as majority owner. This allowed the company to have much greater control over the operations of its investments. Buckley refocused the company to find strategic partnerships with traditional industry leaders such as a joint venture with DuPont called CapSpan in early 2000. ICG sold Logistics.com to Manhattan Associates for $20 million in 2003.

Winding down 
In February 2013, the company sold its stake in Channel Intelligence to Google for $60 million in proceeds. By December, the company sold Procurian to Accenture for $375 million.

In September 2014, when the company changed its name to Actua Corporation, its stock was trading around $20 per share and was worth approximately $700 million. In October 2016, the company sold Govdelivery to Vista Equity Partners for $153 million. December of the following year, the company sold its interests in VelocityEHS and Bolt Solutions for $328 million.

In January 2018, the company sold FolioDynamix for net proceeds of $166.3 million. That same year, the company underwent liquidation.

References

1996 establishments in Pennsylvania
1999 initial public offerings
Companies based in Philadelphia
Companies formerly listed on the Nasdaq
Dot-com bubble
Venture capital firms of the United States
Financial services companies established in 1996
Financial services companies disestablished in 2018